Suren Suror Putek is a 2005 Indian Assamese language comedy drama movie directed by Chandra Mudoi. The title role is played by Jatin Bora. This is the first Assamese film to highlight the art of magic and the talented magicians of the state.

Plot summary
The film revolves around the escapades of Soni (Jatin Bora), the son of a thief named Suren. Realising that he will always be looked down upon as his father's son, the youth takes to magic in a bid to achieve success and earn respect.

Cast
Jatin Bora as Soni
Prastuti Parashar as Rose
Nishita Goswami as Malini
Dr Rajen Jaiswal
Chiranjiv Mahanta
Chetana Das
Upasana Bhoralee 
Prabal Barthakur
Emon Kashyap

Soundtrack

The music of Suren Suror Putek is composed by Dr Hitesh Baruah.

Awards
Jyotirupa Join Media Award For Excellence in Film Television & Music - Best Actor in Comic Role: Jatin Bora

See also
Jollywood

References

External links
 

2005 films
Films set in Assam
2000s Assamese-language films